Sayyad Shirazi Expressway is an expressway in eastern Isfahan, Iran.

It is named after the assassinated Ali Sayad Shirazi, chief-of-staff of the Iranian Armed Forces during the eight-year Iran–Iraq war.

Streets in Isfahan